The  is a Japanese railway line which connects Minami-Toyama Station in Toyama, Toyama Prefecture with Iwakuraji Station in Tateyama, Toyama Prefecture. It is owned and run by Toyama Chihō Railway. This line and the Toyama Chihō Railway Fujikoshi Line are operated as a single line.

History
The Toyama Prefectural Government opened the line in 1921, electrifying it at 600 VDC in 1927 and raising the voltage to 1500 VDC in 1937 to match the electrification on the Toyama Chihō Railway Tateyama Line.

The line was merged into the Toyama Chihō Railway Co. upon its creation in 1943.

Former connecting lines
 Minami-Toyama station - the 12km line to Sasazu on the Takayama Line opened in 1914 and was electrified at 600 VDC in 1943 as it also connected to the Toyama City Tram Line. The line closed in 1975.

Station list

See also
 List of railway lines in Japan

References
This article incorporates material from the corresponding article in the Japanese Wikipedia

Rail transport in Toyama Prefecture
1067 mm gauge railways in Japan